Limacodinae is a subfamily of moths in the family Limacodidae.

References 

 
Moth subfamilies